Thekkemala is a small sub-village of Kozhencherry in Pathanamthitta district, Kerala, India.

Transportation
Thekkemala is a big junction. The roads to Aranmula, Chengannur, Pandalam, and Pathanamthitta join in Thekkemala.

Churches
On the way to Kozhencherry there is a big Malankara Orthodox Syrian Church named Mar Beshanania Church. It's a four way junction leading to Pathanamthitta, Punnakadu, Aranmula.

There is also an Pentecostal Mission church named Thekkemala Apostolic Mission (TAMI).

Demographics
The majority of the population are Christians and Hindus.

References 

Villages in Pathanamthitta district